John Hope "Slick" Lollar (October 4, 1905 – May 7, 1945) was an American football back for the Green Bay Packers of the National Football League (NFL). He played college football for Samford. He played high school football at Walker High School.

Biography
Lollar was born on October 4, 1905, in Alabama. He played high school football for Walker High School in Jasper, Alabama. He went on to play college football for Samford before joining the Green Bay Packers of the National Football League (NFL) for the 1928 NFL season. He died on May 7, 1945.

See also
 List of Green Bay Packers players

References

1905 births
1945 deaths
Green Bay Packers players
Samford Bulldogs football players
Sportspeople from Alabama
People from Jasper, Alabama